I Am Not Your Negro is a 2016 documentary film and social critique film essay directed by Raoul Peck, based on James Baldwin's unfinished manuscript Remember This House. Narrated by actor Samuel L. Jackson, the film explores the history of racism in the United States through Baldwin's recollections of civil rights leaders Medgar Evers, Malcolm X and Martin Luther King Jr., as well as his personal observations of American history. It was nominated for Best Documentary Feature at the 89th Academy Awards and won the BAFTA Award for Best Documentary. The film was internationally co-financed between Germany and the United States.

Synopsis

Prologue
The film opens with a 1968 interview on The Dick Cavett Show. Cavett notes that Baldwin is often asked a stubborn question: "Why aren't the Negroes optimistic?" He says that many people believe the situation to be improving considerably, with Black people now holding positions of influence across society: as mayors, professional athletes, politicians and TV actors. Cavett asks Baldwin, "Is it at once getting much better and still hopeless?"

In response, Baldwin says, "I don't think there's much hope for it, as long as people are using this peculiar language. It's not a question of what happens to the Negro here, [though] that is a very vivid question for me. The real question is what's going to happen to this country? I have to repeat that." Baldwin continues to assert throughout the film that the fate of the United States is directly linked to how effectively it addresses the plight of Black Americans. The prospects for the entire country and the prospects for Black Americans are inextricably tied together such that the truth and reckoning for one becomes the same for the other.

The film is divided into five chapters across which Baldwin weaves the assassinations of Medgar Evers, Malcolm X, and Martin Luther King Jr..

Chapters
The first chapter, "Paying My Dues," portrays the school integration era of the civil rights movement and the fierce resistance to it displayed by many white Americans in an attempt to maintain segregation and the status quo of white supremacy.

The second chapter, "Heroes," highlights how white film protagonists are near-universally portrayed through a romantic, heroic lens when pursuing and protecting their interests, even and especially through the use of violence and rape. This is contrasted with the media portrayal of Black Americans who do not even need to be pursuing their interests to be suspected of crimes or deviant behavior and to face the barbaric consequences of those unfounded suspicions.

In May 1963, Baldwin calls a meeting with Attorney General Robert F. Kennedy. With playwright Lorraine Hansberry in attendance, the meeting devolves into a tense standoff and does not conclude amicably. It does, however, contribute to Kennedy's awakening to the significance and urgency of racial issues across the country.

The third chapter, "Purity," discusses many of the socially constructed dividing lines which have separated black and white America, as well as the imbalance in expectations for deference, racial purity, social capital, spending power, the achievement ceiling, and so on.

In 1965, at a Cambridge University debate with conservative commentator William F. Buckley Jr., Baldwin expounds on a recent remark from ex-AG Kennedy: "It's conceivable that in 40 years in America, we might have a Negro president." He makes clear the absurdity and bitterness with which many Black Americans received the remark: "Black people have been here all along, for the entire 400 years since European colonization began. They were kidnapped, brought to America against their will, and subjugated into subhuman, slave-laborer conditions. And yet they must wait 40 more years to even have a remote chance of being permitted into the highest office in the land?"

The fourth chapter, "Selling the Negro," tracks the history of exploitation of Black people, from an economy of forced labor at the outset to an economy of imprisonment today. A perennial tension in American life is emphasized, brought about by the historic and continued oppression of Black Americans versus an unyielding effort among many white Americans to convince themselves that any racial problem that may have existed in the past has since been resolved.

The fifth and final chapter, "I Am Not A Nigger," elucidates the modern-day condition of Black America by tying the strands of the previous four chapters together. In the closing scene, Baldwin asserts that "I can't be a pessimist because I'm alive, so I'm forced to be an optimist. But the future of the Negro in this country is precisely as bright or as dark as the future of the country. It is entirely up to the American people whether or not they are going to face and deal with and embrace this stranger whom they maligned so long. What white people have to do is try to find out in their own hearts why it was necessary to have a 'nigger' in the first place. Because I am not a nigger, I am a man! But if you think I'm a nigger, it means you need him. And the question the white population of this country has got to ask itself—North and South, because it's one country, and for a Negro there is no difference between the North and the South. It's just a difference in the way they castrate you, but the fact of the castration is the American fact—If I am not the nigger here, and you the white people invented him, then you've got to find out why. And the future of the country depends on that, whether or not it's able to ask [itself] that question."

Cast

Release
The film premiered at the 2016 Toronto International Film Festival, where it won the Toronto International Film Festival People's Choice Award: Documentaries. Shortly after, Magnolia Pictures and Amazon Studios acquired distribution rights to the film. It was released for an Oscar-qualifying run on December 9, 2016, before re-opening on February 3, 2017.

Box office
I Am Not Your Negro grossed $7,123,919 in the United States and $1,221,379 internationally. The film industry website IndieWire attributed, in part, the financial success of the movie to the release shortly before the announcement of Academy Award nominees, opening in an unusually high number of cities, and in non-traditional movie theaters that would generate a word of mouth following.

Critical response
On Rotten Tomatoes, the film has an approval rating of 99% based on 206 reviews, with an average rating of 8.90/10. The website's critical consensus reads, "I Am Not Your Negro offers an incendiary snapshot of James Baldwin's crucial observations on American race relations—and a sobering reminder of how far we've yet to go." On Metacritic, the film has a weighted average score of 95 out of 100, based on 36 critics, indicating "universal acclaim". The film received low user-generated ratings upon its release on IMDb and Metacritic, leading to accusations of vote brigading.

Joe Morgenstern from The Wall Street Journal said, "the film is unsparing as history and enthralling as biography. It's an evocation of a passionate soul in a tumultuous era, a film that uses Baldwin's spoken words, and his notes for an unfinished book, to illuminate the struggle for civil rights."

Awards and nominations
I Am Not Your Negro was nominated for numerous international awards and won over a dozen, including the following:

See also
 Hate crime
 Human rights
 Post-civil rights era in African-American history
 Civil rights movement in popular culture
 List of black films of the 2010s
 Black Lives Matter
 If Beale Street Could Talk - both the novel and 2018 Oscar-winning adaptation directed by Barry Jenkins

References

External links
 
 
 Official site

2016 films
2016 documentary films
Documentary films about racism in the United States
American documentary films
Documentary films about African Americans
Documentary films about the civil rights movement
Amazon Studios films
Films directed by Raoul Peck
French documentary films
Swiss documentary films
BAFTA winners (films)
Films based on works by James Baldwin
Collage film
2010s English-language films
2010s American films
2010s French films
Essays about film